Dawid Kruiper Local Municipality is a local municipality of South Africa. It was established after the August 2016 local elections by merging Mier and //Khara Hais local municipalities. and named after the San politician Dawid Kruiper.

Politics

The municipal council consists of thirty-three members elected by mixed-member proportional representation. Seventeen councillors are elected by first-past-the-post voting in seven wards, while the remaining sixteen are chosen from party lists so that the total number of party representatives is proportional to the number of votes received. In the election of 1 November 2021 the African National Congress (ANC) won a majority of eighteen seats on the council.

The following table shows the results of the election.

References

External links
 Official website

Local municipalities of the ZF Mgcawu District Municipality